Mill Creek Historic District may refer to:

United States
(by state)
Mill Creek Plantation, Thomasville, GA, a historic district listed on the NRHP in Georgia
Mill Creek Park Historic District, Youngstown, OH, listed on the NRHP in Ohio
Mill Creek Historic District (Bryn Mawr and Gladwyne, Pennsylvania), listed on the NRHP in Pennsylvania
Mill Creek Historic District (Bunker Hill, West Virginia), listed on the NRHP in West Virginia